Est 0.189 to 0.200 were 0-6-0 locomotives for freight traffic of the Chemins de fer de l'Est.
They were put in service in 1857 and were retired until 1928.

Construction history
The machines were of similar design as the Est 0.33–0.120 and were built in the workshops of the Chemins de fer de l'Est at Épernay in 1855–1856.

The locomotives were given the following names:

Service history
The locomotives were used for freight trains, similar to the Est 0.63–0.120 for mixed service.
In 1875 the machines were listed at the depots Châlons, Bar-le-Duc, Troyes, Chaumont, Nancy, Epinal, Vesoul and Belfort and were used to run freight trains from Paris to Nancy and to Belfort, from Nancy to Belfort and on branch lines.
Later the machines were used on secondary lines and shunting.
The last locomotive in service, the Est 0.198, was removed from service in 1928.

References

Bibliography

 

Steam locomotives of France
0.189
0-6-0 locomotives
Railway locomotives introduced in 1857
C n2 locomotives
Freight locomotives